Seychelles, officially the Republic of Seychelles, is a 115-island country spanning an archipelago in the Indian Ocean, some  east of mainland Southeast Africa, northeast of the island of Madagascar.

Since Seychelles' independence in 1976, per capita output in this Indian Ocean archipelago has expanded to roughly seven times the old near-subsistence level. Growth has been led by the tourist sector, which employs about 30% of the labor force and provides more than 70% of hard currency earnings, followed by tuna fishing.  In recent years the government has encouraged foreign investment in order to upgrade hotels and other services. At the same time, the government has moved to reduce the dependence on tourism by promoting the development of farming, fishing, small-scale manufacturing and most recently the offshore sector. The vulnerability of the tourist sector was illustrated by the sharp drop in 1991-92 due largely to the Gulf War. Although the industry has rebounded, the government recognizes the continuing need for upgrading the sector in the face of stiff international competition.

Notable firms 
This list includes notable companies with primary headquarters located in the country. The industry and sector follow the Industry Classification Benchmark taxonomy. Organizations which have ceased operations are included and noted as defunct.

See also 
 Economy of Seychelles
 List of airlines of Seychelles
 List of banks in Seychelles

References 

Companies of Seychelles
Economy of Seychelles
 
Seychelles